Amanda Drew (born 12 December 1969) is an English actress with extensive credits in theatre, television and film.

Biography

One of four children, Drew was born in Boston, Lincolnshire. Drew's mother was a nurse and her father was a vicar. When her parents moved to Leicestershire for work, Drew was educated at Beauchamp College in Oadby where she joined a youth theatre, playing Charity in Sweet Charity. She later attended King's School, Ottery St. Mary, when her family moved to Devon.

After graduating from RADA in 1992, Drew made her name on stage at the Royal Court Theatre and various other West End productions in both drama and comedy roles. In 2001, she joined the Royal Shakespeare Company. She has appeared on This Morning twice and BBC Breakfast News once both for interviews, and also has attended a podcast interview for The Ugly One at the Royal Court Theatre in 2008.

In March 2009 she starred in the UK premiere of Parlour Song at the Almeida Theatre. In July 2009 she took the role of Claudia Roe, a fictional amalgamation of female executives of the failed Enron Corporation, in ENRON at the Minerva Theatre, Chichester, transferring to Royal Court Theatre in October 2009 and the West End in January 2010.

EastEnders
Drew played the part of Dr. May Wright in the BBC One soap opera, EastEnders, between September 2006 and June 2007, and again in June 2008.
Drew was involved in one of largest storylines of the year, a love triangle between May, her husband Rob Minter (Stuart Laing), and Dawn Swann (Kara Tointon).

The personality of the character has earned her the nickname "Mad May" and "Psycho Doctor" from the media. Drew has described the role as "a gift of a role for any actor because of her complexity." Of her return to EastEnders, she has stated: "I'm so excited to be playing her again. It'd be a shame to give too much away, but she has changed in many ways." Executive producer Diederick Santer has said: "It's great to have Amanda back. May is a hugely popular character. I'm sure viewers will be keen to see what she gets up to and how she's changed."

In May 2007, it was decided that the ending of a current storyline featuring characters of May, Dawn and Rob would be substantially rewritten due to the disappearance of toddler Madeleine McCann. The storyline would have seen May ran off with Dawn and Rob's baby shortly after it had been born. The move attracted some criticism as to how it relates directly to the disappearance of the toddler; the BBC said that "In the current circumstances it was felt any storyline that included a child abduction would be inappropriate and could cause distress to our viewers." May holds Dawn hostage, intending to steal her baby by performing a caesarean section. May is arrested and Drew left the series.

Trailers for Drew's return to EastEnders, had been shown in the weeks running up to her return on BBC channels; on 6 June 2008. She reprised her role as May, under the assumed name of "Jenny". She was seen smoking a cigarette and drinking alcohol, two new activities for the character. May was killed-off on 18 June 2008 when she causes a gas explosion at the Miller house.

Awards
Drew won the "Outstanding Newcomer" at the 2003 London Evening Standard Theatre Awards for her performance in Eastward Ho! at the Gielgud Theatre.

Filmography

Television

Film

Video games

Selected stage appearances

The Memory of Water
The Man of Mode (1994)
The Way of the World (1995)
John Gabriel Borkman (1996)
Taking Sides (1997)
The School of Night (1999)
The House of Bernarda Alba (1999)
Top Girls (2000)
Jubilee (2001)
Eastward Ho! (2002)
The Island Princess (2002)
Blithe Spirit (2004)
Otherwise Engaged (2005)
Parlour Song (2009)
ENRON (2009–2010)
House of Games (2010)
Butley (2011)
Twelfth Night (2011)
A Streetcar Named Desire (2012)
''Three Days in the Country (2015)

References

External links

Living people
1969 births 

20th-century English actresses
21st-century English actresses
Actresses from Devon
Actresses from Leicestershire
Alumni of RADA
English soap opera actresses
English stage actresses
English television actresses
People from Boston, Lincolnshire
People from Oadby
Royal Shakespeare Company members